Andrey Mikhaylovich Talashko (born 31 May 1982) is a Belarusian racewalker. He competed in the men's 20 kilometres walk at the 2004 Summer Olympics.

References

1982 births
Living people
Athletes (track and field) at the 2004 Summer Olympics
Belarusian male racewalkers
Olympic athletes of Belarus
Place of birth missing (living people)